"Hello! Ma Baby" is a Tin Pan Alley song written in 1899 by the songwriting team of Joseph E. Howard and Ida Emerson, known as "Howard and Emerson". Its subject is a man who has a girlfriend he knows only through the telephone. At the time, telephones were relatively novel, present in fewer than 10% of U.S. households, and this was the first well-known song to refer to the device. Additionally, the word "Hello" itself was primarily associated with telephone use after Edison's utterance—by 1889, "Hello Girl" was slang for a telephone operator—though it later became a general greeting for all situations.

The song was first recorded by Arthur Collins on an Edison 5470 phonograph cylinder.

It was originally a "coon song", with African-American caricatures on the sheet music and "coon" references in the lyrics.

The song may be best known today as the introductory song in the famous Warner Bros. cartoon One Froggy Evening (1955), sung by the character later dubbed Michigan J. Frog and high-stepping in the style of a cakewalk.

Influence
In Charles Ives's 1906 composition Central Park in the Dark, it is quoted frequently.

The short piano piece The Little Nigar (Le petit nègre) by Claude Debussy from 1909 features a melody very similar to "Hello! Ma Baby" and may have been inspired by the song.

Sheet music and the Warner Bros. acquisition of the song

The sheet music was published by T. B. Harms & Co., which was acquired by Warner Bros. before the Stock Market Crash of 1929 (during the advent of the "Talkies" era of cinema).

In popular culture

 In the 1941 black-and-white film adaptation of Jack London's novel The Sea-Wolf, the song is being sung in the opening scene in a bar.
 In the classic Chuck Jones directed Merrie Melodies cartoon One Froggy Evening, a singing, Michigan J. Frog sings a number of songs from before the era the 1955 cartoon was made, with this song being the most remembered by viewers.
 Bing Crosby included the song in a medley on his album 101 Gang Songs (1961)
 In The Virginian season one episode "The Exiles", the song is performed by actress Tammy Grimes.
 In the 1966 film A Big Hand for the Little Lady, the song is heard being sung in the background near the end of the film.
 In the 1973 Disney film Charley and the Angel, when asked about his life as a mortal, the angel Roy sings the song.
 In the 1983 Kenny Rogers made-for-television movie, Kenny Rogers as The Gambler: The Adventure Continues, the character Kate Muldoon, played by Linda Evans, sings the song on-stage in a town saloon.
 In Mel Brooks' 1987 film Spaceballs, parodying Alien, a chest-bursting alien escapes John Hurt's chest, homaging the Chuck Jones cartoon by dancing down a space-diner's counter while singing the song, prompting Barf and Lone Starr to ask for the check.
 In The Simpsons third-season episode "Treehouse of Horror II" from 1991, Principal Skinner sings the song over the elementary school public-address system during the segment "The Bart Zone". In the fifth-season episode "Homer's Barbershop Quartet" from 1993 (which takes place in Springfield in 1985), Homer, Skinner, Wiggum and Apu sing a barbershop quartet rendition of the song.
 In the 2004 TV series Wonderfalls, episode 1, the wax lion sings the song to irritate Jaye into doing what she is told.
 In episode 7 of the Cartoon Network television program Ninjago, the character Zane (a robot) begins singing the song once his "funny switch" is enabled. Does this again in episode 41.
 The Jam Band Phish was known to perform the song fairly often in the 90's barbershop style huddle around a singular microphone. Prompting many people in the large arenas and stadiums to shush people to be quiet in order to hear the song in full.
 In The Office (American TV series), episode 18 of Season 8, Last Day in Florida, Toby and Darryl compete in singing the song for Kevin Malone to win the right to sell him Girl Scout cookies.
 In the Mad Men season three episode "My Old Kentucky Home", Paul Kinsey performs the song after being confronted about his singing skills.
 In Red Dead Redemption 2, Polish singer Robin Koninsky (voiced by Robyn Adele Anderson of Postmodern Jukebox fame) performs the song in Saint Denis during a vaudeville show.

References

External links
 Sheet music for "Hello! Ma Baby" as published by T.B. Harms & Co. (as stored by the Duke University Libraries).

1899 songs
Songs written by Joseph E. Howard
Rags
Songs about telephone calls
Looney Tunes songs